The 37th Ryder Cup Matches were held September 19–21, 2008, in the United States at Valhalla Golf Club in Louisville, Kentucky. Team USA won 16 - 11 to end the streak of three successive victories for Europe. This was USA's largest margin of victory since 1981 and the first time since 1979 that the Americans had held the lead after every session of play. The team captains were Paul Azinger for the US and Nick Faldo for Europe.

The U.S. team had been in the lead since the contest began on the Friday. Europe was two points behind going into the Sunday singles matches. They had only previously overturned a deficit once before, in 1995. USA won the majority of the first matches out and subsequently Jim Furyk defeated Miguel Ángel Jiménez 2 & 1 to win his match and win the Ryder Cup for the USA. Other matches still out on the course would see this margin of victory increase further. Following the defeat Nick Faldo was heavily criticised for his decision to "bottom load" his best players in the singles when the Americans only needed 5 points to win which they got before they could have any effect on the overall outcome.

Television
All matches were covered live in the United States. ESPN handled Friday coverage. Mike Tirico and Andy North hosted from the 18th tower, with Curtis Strange calling holes, and on-course reporters Billy Kratzert and Judy Rankin. With Azinger, ESPN's lead analyst, captaining the U.S. team, North was moved to the booth to fill Azinger's seat. NBC Sports covered the weekend action, with Dan Hicks and Johnny Miller hosting from the 18th tower, Gary Koch and Bob Murphy calling holes, and on-course reporters Mark Rolfing, Roger Maltbie, and Dottie Pepper.

Format 
The Ryder Cup is a match play event, with each match worth one point. The competition format used in 2008 was:

 Day 1 (Friday)—four foursomes (alternate shot) matches in the morning session and four fourball (better ball) matches in the afternoon
 Day 2 (Saturday)—four foursome matches in the morning and four fourball matches in the afternoon
 Day 3 (Sunday)—12 singles matches

With a total of 28 points available, 14 points were required to win the cup, and 14 points for the defending champion to retain it. All matches were played over a maximum 18 holes.

For the first time since 1995, the opening matches featured foursomes. US captain Paul Azinger chose the format, hoping to give his team an early advantage in Kentucky. Foursomes was used in the first sessions of every event since 1981 until European captain Seve Ballesteros opened with better ball (fourball) in 1997 at Valderrama.

Team qualification and selection

United States
The selection process was radically changed for 2008. The United States team consisted of:
 The top eight players on the Ryder Cup Points List
Money earned in 2008 majors counted double and money earned in 2008 events played opposite the majors or World Golf Championships counted half. The new points system was only announced in November 2006 after the previous system had started. Under the previous system players earned points from August 27, 2006 when they finished in the top 10 in official events. Because of the late change to the qualification rules, players who had finished in the top 10 during the period from August 27 to November 5, 2006 were awarded a quarter of a point for every $1,000 earned.
 Four captain's picks

Europe
The qualification process was the same as in 2006. The European team consisted of:
 The top five players on the Ryder Cup World Points List
Total points earned in Official World Golf Ranking events from  2007 to  2008 and then only in the Johnnie Walker Championship at Gleneagles, which ended on August 31.
 The five players, not qualified above, on the Ryder Cup European Points List
Money earned in official European Tour events from  2007 to  2008
 Two captain's picks
The final line-up for the European team was announced after the Johnnie Walker Championship at Gleneagles on August 31, 2008. Søren Hansen, Oliver Wilson and Justin Rose were the last three automatic qualifiers after successful tournaments. Nick Faldo handed wildcards to Paul Casey and Ian Poulter.

Teams

Captains
The team captains were Paul Azinger for the US and Nick Faldo for Europe.

Vice-captains
The USA vice-captains were Olin Browne, Raymond Floyd and Dave Stockton.

The only European vice-captain was José María Olazábal. Paul McGinley had been announced as a vice-captain in May 2007 but resigned in September 2007.

Players

Tiger Woods was the leading player on the points list but was recovering from knee surgery and unable to compete. Captains picks are shown in yellow; the world rankings and records are at the start of the 2008 Ryder Cup.

Captains picks are shown in yellow; the world rankings and records are at the start of the 2008 Ryder Cup.

Friday's matches

Morning foursomes
The morning foursomes began well for Team Europe, as they took the lead in all four matches within the first hour. However, things changed by the end of the morning, with Team USA ending the session up 3–1, marking the first time since the last American win in 1999 that Team USA held the lead at the end of any Ryder Cup session.

Afternoon four-ball
The afternoon session was almost a replay of the morning session. Team Europe led after the front nine in three of the four matches, but only won one. Team USA ended up with its largest lead after the first day since Europe was first included in the Ryder Cup in 1979.

Saturday's matches

Morning foursomes

Afternoon four-ball

Sunday's singles matches

Individual player records
Each entry refers to the win–loss–half record of the player.

Source:

United States

Europe

References

External links 
 Official site
 Valhalla course site
 Full results

Ryder Cup
Golf in Kentucky
Sports competitions in Louisville, Kentucky
Ryder Cup
Ryder Cup
Ryder Cup
Ryder Cup